

A–D 

To find entries for A–D, use the table of contents above.

E 

 E.A.Barkley – Elizabeth Anne Barkley (born 1908)
 E.A.Barthol. – Elizabeth Ann Bartholomew (1912–1985)
 E.A.Br. – Elizabeth Anne Brown (1956–2013)
 E.A.Bruce – Eileen Adelaide Bruce (1905–1955)
 E.A.Durand – Ernest Armand Durand (1872–1910)
 E.A.Flint – Elizabeth Alice Flint (1909–2011) 
 E.A.Hodgs. – Eliza Amy Hodgson (1888–1983)
 E.A.Kellogg – Elizabeth Anne Kellogg (born 1951)
 Eakes – Michael James Eakes (fl. 1999)
 E.A.Mennega – Erik Albert Mennega (1923–1998)
 Eames – Edwin Hubert Eames (1865–1948)
 E.Arber – Edward Alexander Newell Arber (1870–1918)
 Eardley – Constance Margaret Eardley (1910–1978)
 Earle – Franklin Sumner Earle (1856–1929)
 E.Arm. – Eleanora Armitage (1865–1961) 
 E.A.Rob. – Edward Armitage Robinson (1921–2013)
 E.A.Sánchez – Evangelina A. Sánchez (born 1934)
 E.A.Shaw – Elizabeth Anne Shaw (born 1938)
 Eastw. – Alice Eastwood (1859–1953)
 Eaton – Amos Eaton (1776–1842)
 E.A.White – Edward Albert White (1872–1943)
 E.B.Alexeev – Evgenii Borisovich Alexeev (1946–1976)
 E.B.Andrews – Ebenezer Baldwin Andrews (1821–1880)
 E.Barnes – Edward Barnes (1892–1941) 
 E.B.Bartram – Edwin Bunting Bartram (1878–1964)
 E.B.Chamb. – Edward Blanchard Chamberlain (1878–1925) 
 Eberm. – Johann Erdwin Christoph Ebermaier (1769–1825) 
 Eb.Fisch. – Eberhard Fischer (born 1969)
 Ebinger – John Edwin Ebinger (born 1933)
 E.B.Knox – Eric B. Knox (fl. 1993)
 E.Britton – Elizabeth Gertrude Britton (née Knight) (1858–1934)
 E.C.Hall – Edwin Cuthbert Hall (1874–1953)
 E.C.Hansen – Emil Christian Hansen (1842–1909)
 Eckblad – Finn-Egil Eckblad (1923–2000)
 Eckenw. – James E. Eckenwalder (born 1949)
 Eckl. – Christian Friedrich Ecklon (1795–1868)
 E.C.Nelson – Ernest Charles Nelson (born 1951)
E.Coleman – Edith Coleman (1874–1951)
 E.Cordus – Euricius Cordus (1486–1535)
 E.C.Wallace – Edward Charles Wallace (1909–1986)
 E.Danesch – Edeltraud Danesch (born 1922)
 E.D.Clarke – Edward Daniel Clarke (1769–1822)
 Eddy – Caspar Wistar Eddy (1790–1828)
 É.Desv. – Étienne-Émile Desvaux (1830–1854)
 Edgar – Elizabeth Edgar (born 1929)
 Edgecombe – Walter Brian Edgecombe (born 1945)
 Edgew. – Michael Pakenham Edgeworth (1812–1881)
 Edginton – Mark Alexander Edginton (fl. 2015)
 E.D.Liu – En-De Liu (fl. 2004)
 Edmondston – Thomas Edmondston (1825–1846)
 Ed.Otto – Carlos Frederico Eduardo Otto (1812–1885)
 E.D.Rudolph – Emanuel David Rudolph (1927–1992)
 E.D.Schulz – Ellen Dorothy Schulz (1892–1970)
 Edwin – Gabriel Edwin (born 1926)
 Eeden – Frederik Willem van Eeden (1829–1901)
 É.E.Foëx – Étienne Edmond Foëx (1876–1944)
 E.E.Lamont – Eric E. Lamont (fl. 1990)
 E.E.Nelson – Elias Emanuel Nelson (1876–1949)
 E.E.Schill. – Edward E. Schilling (born 1953)
 E.E.Wilson – Edward Elmer Wilson (born 1900)
 E.F.Anderson – Edward Frederick Anderson (1932–2001)
 E.Fisch. – Eduard Fischer (1861–1939)
 E.Forbes – Edward Forbes (1815–1854)
 E.Forst. – Edward Forster (1765–1849)
 E.Fourn. – Eugène Pierre Nicolas Fournier (1834–1884)
 E.F.Warb. – Edmund Frederic Warburg (1908–1966)
 Egan – Robert Shaw Egan (born 1945)
 E.G.Andrews – Elisabeth G. Andrews, later Hooper (born 1960)
 E.G.Camus – Edmond Gustave Camus (1852–1915)
 E.G.Clem. – Edith Gertrude (Schwartz) Clements (1877–1971)
 Eggeling – William Julius Eggeling (1909–1994)
 Eggers – Henrik Franz Alexander von Eggers (1844–1903)
 Eggl. – Willard Webster Eggleston (1863–1935)
 Eggli – Urs Eggli (born 1959)
 E.G.H.Oliv. – Edward George Hudson Oliver (born 1938)
 Egler – Frank Edwin Egler (1911–1996)
 Egli – Bernhard Egli (fl. 1990)
 E.Goeze – Edmund Goeze (1838–1929)
 E.G.Voss – Edward Groesbeck Voss (1929–2012)
 E.Hitchc. – Edward Hitchcock (1793–1864)
 E.H.L.Krause – Ernst Hans Ludwig Krause (1859–1942)
 E.Hofm. – Elise Hofmann (1889–1955)
 Ehrenb. – Christian Gottfried Ehrenberg (1795–1876)
 Ehrend. – Friedrich Ehrendorfer (born 1927)
 Ehret – Georg Dionysius Ehret (1708–1770)
 Ehrh. – Jakob Friedrich Ehrhart (1742–1795)
 E.H.Wilson – Ernest Henry Wilson (1876–1930)
 Eichler – August Wilhelm Eichler (1839–1887)
 Eichw. – Karl Eduard von Eichwald (1795–1876)
 Eig – Alexander Eig (1894–1938)
 E.Ives – Eli Ives (1779–1861)
 E.James – Edwin P. James (1797–1861)
 E.J.Butler – Edwin John Butler (1874–1943)
 E.J.Clement – E.J. Clement (fl. 2000)
 E.J.Dunn – Edward John Dunn (1844–1937)
 E.-J.Gilbert – Edouard-Jean Gilbert (1888–1954)
 E.J.Hill – Ellsworth Jerome Hill (1833–1917)
 E.J.Lowe – Edward Joseph Lowe (1825–1900)
 E.J.Palmer – Ernest Jesse Palmer (1875–1962)
 E.J.Quekett – Edwin John Quekett (1808–1847) (brother of John Thomas Quekett)
 E.J.Schmidt – Ernst Johannes Schmidt (1877–1933)
 E.K.Cameron – Ewen Kenneth Cameron (born 1949)
 Ekman – Erik Leonard Ekman (1883–1931)
 E.Lawton – Elva Lawton (1896–1993)
 E.L.Braun – Emma Lucy Braun (1889–1971)
 E.L.Cabral – Elsa Leonor Cabral (born 1951)
 É.Lemoine – Émile Lemoine (1862–1943)
 Elisens – Wayne J. Elisens (born 1948)
 Eliz.George – Elizabeth Anne George (1935–2012)
 Elliott – Stephen Elliott (1771–1830)
 Ellis – Job Bicknell Ellis (1829–1905)
 Ellw. – George Ellwanger (1816–1906)
 Elmer – Adolph Daniel Edward Elmer (1870–1942)
 E.L.Rand – Edward Lothrop Rand (1859–1924)
 E.L.Robertson – Enid Lucy Robertson (1925–2016)
 E.L.Schneid. – Edward L. Schneider (born 1947)
 Elvebakk – Arve Elvebakk (born 1951)
 Elven – Reidar Elven (born 1947)
 Elwes – Henry John Elwes (1846–1922)
 E.L.Wolf – Egbert Ludwigowitsch Wolf (1860–1931)
 E.Martin – Émile Martin (1810–1895)
 E.Martínez – Esteban Martínez (born 1954)
 E.Mayer – Ernest Mayer (1920–2009)
 Emb. – Louis Emberger (1897–1969)
 E.M.Benn. – Eleanor Marion Bennett (born 1942)
 E.Mey. – Ernst Heinrich Friedrich Meyer (1791–1858)
 E.M.Friis – Else Marie Friis (born 1947)
 E.M.McClint. – Elizabeth May McClintock (1912–2004)
 E.M.Norman – Eliane Meyer Norman (born 1931)
 E.M.O.Martins – Elena Maria Occioni Martins (born 1948)
 E.Morren – Charles Jacques Édouard Morren (1833–1886)
 E.Morris – Edward Lyman Morris (1870–1913)
 Emory – William Hemsley Emory (1811–1887)
 E.M.Ross – Estelle M. Ross (born 1952)
 Enderlein – Günther Enderlein (1872–1968)
 Endert – Frederik Hendrik Endert (1891–1953)
 Endl. – Stephan Friedrich Ladislaus Endlicher (1804–1849)
 Endrés –  (1838–1874)
 E.Nelson – Erich Nelson (1897–1980)
 Engel – Franz Engel (1834–1920)
 Engelm. – Georg Engelmann (1809–1884)
 Engl. – Heinrich Gustav Adolf Engler (1844–1930)
 E.N.Lowe – Ephriam Noble Lowe (1864–1933)
 Enright – Pat Enright (fl. 2011)
 E.O.Campb. – Ella Orr Campbell (1910–2003)
 E.Olivier – (Joseph) Ernst Olivier (1844–1914)
 E.O.Schmidt – Eduard Oscar Schmidt (1823–1886)
 E.Palmer – Elmore Palmer (1839–1909)
 E.P.Bicknell – Eugene Pintard Bicknell (1859–1925)
 E.Peter – Elfriede Peter-Stibal (1905–?)
 E.Phillips – Edwin Percy Phillips (1884–1967)
 Epling – Carl Clawson Epling (1894–1968)
 E.P.Perrier – Eugène Pierre Perrier de la Bâthie (1825–1916)
 E.Pritz. – Ernst Georg Pritzel (1875–1948)
 E.P.Wright – Edward Perceval (Percival) Wright (1834–1910)
 Erdman – Kimball Stewart Erdman (born 1937)
 Erdmann – Carl Gottfried Erdmann (1774–1835)
 Erdtman – Otto Gunnar Elias Erdtman (1897–1973)
 E.Reid – Eleanor Mary Wynne-Edwards Reid (1860–1953)
 E.Rev. – Elisée Reverchon (1835–1914)
 E.R.Farr – Ellen R. Farr (born 1941)
 Ericsson – Stefan Ericsson (1954–2015)
 Ericzjan –  A. A. Ericzjan (fl. 1960)
 E.R.Noble – Elmer Ray Noble (1909–2001)
 Ernst – Adolf Ernst (1832–1899)
 E.Robson – Edward Robson (1763–1813)
 E.Rosén – Eberhard Rosén (1714–1796)
 Er.Rosen – Eric von Rosen (1879–1948)
 E.R.Saunders – Edith Rebecca Saunders (1865–1945)
 Ertter – Barbara Jean Ertter (born 1953)
 E.Sabine – Edward Sabine (1788–1883)
 E.Salisb. – Edward James Salisbury (1886–1978)
 E.S.Anderson – Edgar Shannon Anderson (1897–1969)
 E.S.Barton – Ethel Sarel Barton (1864–1922)
 E.S.Burgess – Edward Sandford Burgess (1855–1928)
 E.Schenk – Ernst Schenk (1880–1965)
 E.Schiem. – Elisabeth Schiemann (1881–1972)
 Eschsch. – Johann Friedrich von Eschscholtz (1793–1831)
 Eshbaugh – W. Hardy Eshbaugh (born 1936)
 E.Sheld. – Edmund Perry Sheldon (1869–1947)
 E.Simon – Eugène Ernest Simon (1871–1967)
 E.Small – Ernest Small (born 1940)
 E.S.Martins – Eurico Sampaio Martins (born 1944)
 Esper – Eugenius Johann Christoph Esper (1742–1810)
 E.S.Salmon – Ernest Stanley Salmon (1871–1959)
 E.S.Steele – Edward Strieby Steele (1850–1942)
 Essig – Frederick Burt Essig (born 1947)
 Esterh. – Elsie Elizabeth Esterhuysen (1912–2006)
 Esteves – Eddie Esteves Pereira (born 1939)
 E.T.Barthol. – Elbert Thomas Bartholomew (born 1878)
 E.T.Geddes – Elizabeth T. Geddes (fl. 1927–1932)
 Ether. – Robert Etheridge, Jr. (1847–1920)
 E.Thurst. – Edgar Thurston (1855–1935)
 Etl. – Andreas Ernst Etlinger (1756–1785)
 E.T.Newton – Edwin Tulley (Tully) Newton (1840–1930)
 Ettingsh. – Constantin von Ettingshausen (1826–1897)
 Euphrasén – Bengt Anders Euphrasén (1756–1796)
 E.Vilm. – Elisa de Vilmorin (1826–1868)
 Ewan – Joseph Ewan (1909–1999)
 Ewart – Alfred James Ewart (1872–1937)
 E.Watson – Elba Emanuel Watson (1871–1936)
 E.W.B.Chase – Ethel Winifred Bennett Chase (1877–1949) 
 E.W.Berry – Edward Wilber Berry (1875–1945)
 E.W.Herv. – Eliphalet Williams Hervey (1834–1925)
 E.Willm. – Ellen Ann Willmott (1858–1934)
 E.Wimm. – Franz Elfried Wimmer (1881–1961)
 E.Winkel – Esmée Winkel (fl. 2013)
 E.W.Jones – Eustace Wilkinson Jones (1909–1992)
 E.W.Nelson – Edward William Nelson (1855–1934)
 F.W.Wakef. – F.W. Wakefield (fl. 1922)
 Exell – Arthur Wallis Exell (1901–1993)
 E.Y.Dawson – Elmer Yale Dawson (1918–1966)
 Eyde – Richard H. Eyde (1928–1990)
 Eyles – Frederick Eyles (1864–1937)
 Eyma – Pierre Joseph Eyma (1903–1945)
 Eyre – William Leigh Williamson Eyre (1841–1914)
 E.Z.Bailey – Ethel Zoe Bailey (1889–1983)

F 

 F.A.Barkley – Fred Alexander Barkley (1908–1989)
 F.A.Bartlett – Francis Alonzo Bartlett (1882–1963)
 F.A.Bauer – Franz (Francis) Andreas Bauer (1758–1840)
 Fabr. – Philipp Conrad Fabricius (1714–1774)
 Fabris – Humberto Antonio Fabris (1924–1976)
 F.A.C.Weber – Frédéric Albert Constantin Weber (1830–1903)
 Faegri – Knut Fægri (or Knut Faegri) (1909–2001)
 Fahn – Avraham (Abraham) Fahn (1916–2012)
 Fairon-Dem. – Muriel Fairon-Demaret (fl. 1986)
 F.Albers – Focke Albers (born 1940)
 Falc. – Hugh Falconer (1808–1865)
 Falck – Richard Falck (1868–1955)
 Falk – Johan Peter (Pehr) Falk (1733–1774)
 Falkenb. – Paul Falkenberg (1848–1925)
 F.Allam. – (Frédérique) Frédéric-Louis Allamand (1735–after 1803)
 Fanning – Una Fanning (fl. 1990)
 F.Aresch. – Frederic Wilhelm Christian Areschoug (1830–1908)
 Farges – Paul Guillaume Farges (1844–1912)
 Farjon – Aljos Farjon (born 1946)
 Farl. – William Gilson Farlow (1844–1919)
 Farmar – Leo Farmar (1878–1907)
 F.A.Rodway – Frederick Arthur Rodway (1880–1956)
 F.A.Rogers – Frederick Arundel Rogers (1876–1944)
 Farrer – Reginald John Farrer (1880–1920)
 Farron – Claude Farron (born 1935)
 Farw. – Oliver Atkins Farwell (1867–1944)
 Fassat. – Olga Fassatiová (1924–2011)
 Fassett – Norman Carter Fassett (1900–1954)
 Favre – Louis Favre (1822–1904)
 Fawc. – William Fawcett (1851–1926)
 Faxon – Charles Edward Faxon (1846–1918)
 Fayod – Victor Fayod (1860–1900)
 F.B.Forbes – Francis Blackwell Forbes (1839–1908)
 F.Bolle – Friedrich Franz August Albrecht Bolle (1905–1999)
 F.Bolus – Frank Bolus (1870–1945)
 F.Boos – Franz Boos (1753–1832)
 F.Br. – Forest Buffen Harkness Brown (1873–1954)
 F.Brachet – Flavien Brachet (died 1910)
 F.Buyss. – François du Buysson (1825–1906)
 F.B.White – Francis Buchanan White (1842–1894)
 F.C.Gates – Frank Caleb Gates (1887–1955)
 F.Chapm. – Frederick Chapman (1864–1943)
 F.C.How – Foon Chew How (1908–1959)
 F.Conti – Fabio Conti (born 1961)
 F.C.Quinn – F. C. Quinn (fl. 1990)
 F.Cuvier – Georges-Frédéric Cuvier (1773–1838)
 F.D.Bowers – Frank Dana Bowers (1936–2019)
 F.Delaroche – François Delaroche (1780–1813)
 F.Dietr. – Friedrich Gottlieb Dietrich (1768–1850)
 F.Duncan – Fred Duncan (fl. 1991)
 F.E.Boynton – Frank Ellis Boynton (1859–1942)
 Fed. – Andrey Aleksandrovich Fedorov (1908–1987)
 Fedde – Friedrich Karl Georg Fedde (1873–1942)
 F.E.Drouet – Francis Elliott Drouet (1907–1982)
 Fée – Antoine Laurent Apollinaire Fée (1789–1874)
 F.E.Fritsch – Felix Eugen Fritsch (1879–1954)
 Feinbrun – Naomi Feinbrun (1900–1995) 
 Feldman – Moshe Feldman (fl. 1978)
 F.E.Leyb. (also Leibold) – Friedrich Ernst Leibold (1804–1864) (surname also spelled "Leybold"; not to be confused with botanist Friedrich Leybold (1827–1879))
 Felger – Richard Stephen Felger (fl. 1968)
 F.E.Lloyd – Francis Ernst Lloyd (1868–1947)
 Fendler – Augustus Fendler (1813–1883)
 Fenzl – Eduard Fenzl (1808–1879)
 Ferd.Schneid. – Ferdinand Schneider (1834–1882)
 Fernald – Merritt Lyndon Fernald (1873–1950)
 Fern.Alonso – José Luis Fernández Alonso (born 1959)
 Fernando – Edwino S. Fernando (born 1953)
 Fern.-Vill. – Celestino Fernández-Villar (1838–1907)
 Ferreras – Ulysses Flores Ferreras (born 1977)
 Ferreyra –  (1910–2005)
 Ferry – René Joseph Justin Ferry (1845–1924)
 Fessel – Hans Fessel (born 1929)
 Feuillée – Louis Éconches Feuillée (Feuillet) (1660–1732)
 F.F.Blackman – Frederick Blackman (1866–1947)
 F.Fleisch. – Franz von Fleischer (1801–1878)
 F.Friedmann – Francis Friedmann (born 1941)
 F.Fromm –  Franz Fromm (fl. 1905)
 F.G.Mey. – Frederick Gustav Meyer (1917–2006)
 F.G.Wallace – Franklin Gerhard Wallace (1909–1995)
 F.Haage – Friedrich Ferdinand Adolph Haage (1859–1930)
 F.Hanb. – Frederick Janson Hanbury (1851–1938)
 F.Harper – Francis Harper (1886–1972)
 F.H.Brandt – Fred H. Brandt (1908–1994)
 F.H.Chen – Chen Feng Huai (Hwai) (1900–1993)
 F.Heim – Frédéric Louis Heim (born 1869)
 F.Heller – Franz Xaver Heller (1775–1840)
 F.H.Hellw. –  (born 1958)
 F.H.Lewis – Frank Harlan Lewis (1919–2008)
 F.H.Perring – Franklyn Hugh Perring (1927–2003) 
 F.H.Wigg. – Friedrich Heinrich Wiggers (1746–1811)
 Ficalho – Franciso Manoel Carlos de Mello de Ficalho (1837–1903)
 Fieber – Franz Xaver Fieber (1807–1872)
 Fiebrig – Karl August Gustav Fiebrig (1869–1951)
 Field – Henry Claylands Field (1825–1912)
 Fielding – Henry Barron Fielding (1805–1851)
 Figlar – Richard B. Figlar (fl. 2000)
 Filat. – Anna A. Filatenko (born 1937)
 Finet – Achille Eugène Finet (1863–1913)
 Finl. – George Finlayson (1790–1823)
 Finschow – Günter Finschow (born 1926)
 Fintelm. – Gustav Adolf Fintelmann (1803–1871)
 Fiori – Adriano Fiori (1865–1950)
 Fior.-Mazz. – Elisabetta Fiorini-Mazzanti (1799–1879)
 Fisch. – Friedrich Ernst Ludwig von Fischer (1782–1854)
 Fisch.-Benz. – Rudolf J. D. von Fischer-Benzon (1839–1911)
 Fisch.-Oost. – Carl von Fischer-Ooster (1807–1875)
 Fisch.Waldh. – Alexander Gregorevich Fischer von Waldheim (1803–1884)
 Fitch – Walter Hood Fitch (1817–1892)
 Fitschen – Jost Fitschen (1869–1947)
 Fitzg. – Robert D. FitzGerald (middle name David or Desmond) (1830–1892)
 F.J.A.Morris – Francis John A. Morris (1869–1949)
 F.J.F.Shaw – Frederick John Freshwater Shaw (1885–1936)
 F.J.Herm. – Frederick Joseph Hermann (1906–1987)
 F.J.Pritch. – Frederick John Pritchard (1874–1931) 
 F.J.Schultz – Franz Johann Schultz (fl. 1785–1847)
 Flagey – Camille Flagey (1837–1898)
 Flahault – Charles Flahault (1852–1935)
 F.L.Bauer – Ferdinand Lucas (Lukas) Bauer (1760–1826)
 F.Lees – Frederick Arnold Lees (1847–1921)
 Fleming – John Fleming (1785–1857)
 F.L.Erickson – Frederica Lucy "Rica" Erickson (1908–2009)
 Flerow – Alexandr Fedorovich Flerow (1872–1960)
 F.Lestib. – François Joseph Lestiboudois (1759–1815)
 Fletcher – James Fletcher (1852–1908)
 Flickinger – Jonathan A. Flickinger
 Flinders – Matthew Flinders (1774–1814)
 F.L.Martin – Floyd Leonard Gabriel Martin (1909–1994)
 Flod. – Björn Gustaf Oscar Floderus (1867–1941)
 Flörke – Heinrich Gustav Flörke (1764–1835)
 Flot. – Julius von Flotow (1788–1856) 
 F.L.Tai – Fung Lan Tai (1893–1973)
 F.Ludw. – Friedrich Ludwig (1851–1918)
 Flueck. – Friedrich August Flückiger (1828–1894)
 Flüggé – Johannes Flüggé (1775–1816)
 Flyr – Lowell David Flyr (1937–1971)
 F.Maek. – Fumio Maekawa (1908–1984)
 F.M.Bailey – Frederick Manson Bailey (1827–1915)
 F.Michx. – François Andre Michaux (1770–1855)
 F.M.Knuth – Frederik Marcus Knuth (1904–1970)
 F.M.Leight. – Frances Margaret Leighton (later Isaac) (1909–2006) (Isaac is also used)
 F.Muell. – Ferdinand von Mueller (1825–1896)
 F.N.Meyer – Frank Nicholas Meyer (surnamed Meijer before 1908) (1875–1918)
 F.N.Williams – Frederic Newton Williams (1862–1923)
 F.Nyl. – Fredrik Nylander (1820–1880)
 Fobe – Frederich Fobe (1864–1946)
 Focke – Wilhelm Olbers Focke (1834–1922)
 Foëx – Gustave Louis Émile Foëx (1844–1906)
 Foldats – Ernesto Foldats Andins (1925–2003)
 Fomin – Aleksandr Vasiljevich Fomin (1869–1935)
 Fontoura – Talita Fontoura fl. 2012)
 Font Quer – Pius Font i Quer (1888–1964)
 Forbes – John Forbes (1799–1823)
 Foreman – Donald Bruce Foreman (1945–2004)
 Forero – Enrique Forero (born 1942)
 Forman – Lewis Leonard Forman (1929–1998)
 Forrest – George Forrest (1873–1932)
 Forrester – Susan G. Forrester (fl. 2007)
 Forssk. – Peter Forsskål (1732–1763)
 Forsstr. – Johan Erik Forsström (1775–1824)
 Forsyth – William Forsyth (1737–1804)
 Forsyth f. – William Forsyth Jr. (?1772–1835)
 Fortune – Robert Fortune (1812–1880)
 Fosberg – Francis Raymond Fosberg (1908–1993)
 Foster – Michael Foster (1836–1907)
 Foucaud – Julien Foucaud (1847–1904)
 Foug. – Auguste Denis Fougeroux de Bandaroy (1732–1789)
 Fourc. – Henry Georges Fourcade (1865–1948)
 Fourcy – Michel-Eugène Lefébure de Fourcy (1812–1889)
 Fourn. – Eugène Pierre Nicolas Fournier (1834–1884)
 Fourr. – Jules Pierre Fourreau (1844–1871)
 Fox – T. Colcott Fox (1849–1916)
 Foxw. – Frederick William Foxworthy (1877–1950)
 F.Patt. – Flora Wambaugh Patterson (1847–1928)
 F.Phil. – Federico Philippi (1838–1910)
 F.Picard – François Picard (1879–1939)
 F.P.Metcalf – Franklin Post Metcalf (1892–1955)
 Fr. – Elias Magnus Fries (1794–1878)
 Fraas – Carl Nicolaus Fraas (1810–1875)
 Franch. – Adrien René Franchet (1834–1900)
 Francis – George William Francis (1800–1865)
 Franco – João Manuel Antonio do Amaral Franco (born 1921)
 Franc.-Ort. – Javier Francisco-Ortega (born 1958)
 Franzén – Roy Franzén (born 1957)
 Frapp. – Charles Frappier (1813–1885)
 Fraser – John Fraser (1750–1811)
 Fraser f. – John Fraser Jr. (c. 1780–1852)
 Fraser-Jenk. – Christopher Roy Fraser-Jenkins (born 1948)
 Frauenf. – Georg von Frauenfeld (1807–1873)
 F.R.Chapm. – Frederick Revans Chapman (1849–1936)
 Freckmann – Robert W. Freckmann (born 1939)
 Frederick – Lafayette Frederick (1923–2018)
 Frege – Christian August Frege (1758–1834)
 Freire-Fierro – Alina Freire-Fierro (born 1964)
 Frém. – John C. Frémont (1813–1890)
 Fresen. – Johann Baptist Georg Wolfgang Fresenius (1808–1866)
 Freudenst. – John V. Freudenstein (born 1963)
 Freyer – Heinrich Freyer (1802–1866)
 Freyn – Josef Franz Freyn (1845–1903)
 Freyr. – Georg Wilhelm Freyreiss (1789–1825)
 Frez. – Amédée-François Frézier (1682–1773)
 Frič – Alberto Vojtěch Frič (1882–1944)
 Friedrich – Hans Christian Friedrich (1925–1992)
 Friis – Ib Friis (born 1945)
 Fritsch – Karl Fritsch (1864–1934)
 F.Ritter – Friedrich Ritter (1898–1989)
 Friv. – Imre (Emerich) Frivaldszky von Frivald (1799–1870)
 Frodin – David Gamman Frodin (born 1940)
 Froel. – Joseph Aloys von Froelich (1766–1841)
 Fronius – Franz Friedrich Fronius (1829–1886)
 F.Rose – Francis Rose (1921–2006)
 Fr.Römer – Fritz Römer (1866–1909)
 Fr.Schneid. – Frits Schneider (1926–2003)
 F.Rudolphi – Friedrich Karl Ludwig Rudolphi (1801–1849)
 Frye – Theodore Christian Frye (1869–1962)
 Fryer – Alfred Fryer (1826–1912)
 Fryxell – Paul Arnold Fryxell (1927–2011)
 F.Schmidt – Friedrich Carl Fedor Bogdanovich Schmidt (1832–1908)
 F.Schmitz – Friedrich Schmitz (1850–1895)
 F.Stein – Samuel Friedrich Nathaniel Ritter von Stein (1818–1885)
 F.S.Wagner – Florence Signaigo Wagner (1919–2019) 
 F.T.Brooks – Frederick Tom (Thom, Thomas) Brooks (1882–1952)
 F.T.Hubb. – Frederic Tracy Hubbard (1875–1962)
 F.Towns. – Frederick Townsend (1822–1905) 
 F.Turner – Frederick Turner (1852–1939)
 F.T.Wang – Fa Tsuan Wang (1899–1985)
 Fuckel (also Fuck.) – Karl Wilhelm Gottlieb Leopold Fuckel (1821–1876)
 Fuertes – Javier Fuertes (born 1960)
 Fukuhara –  (fl. 1997)
 Fukuoka – Nobuyuki Fukuoka (born 1904)
 Fukuy. – Noriaki Fukuyama (1912–1946)
 Fulford – Margaret Hannah Fulford (1904–1999)
 Funck – Heinrich Christian Funck (1771–1839)
 Furtado – Caetano Xavier Furtado (1897–1980)
 Furuki – Tatsuwo Furuki (fl. 1989)
 F.Vierh. – Friedrich Vierhapper (1844–1903) (father of Friedrich Karl Max Vierhapper (1876–1932))
 F.Voigt – Friedrich Siegmund Voigt (1781–1850)
 F.W.Andrews – Frederick William Andrews (died 1961)
 F.Weber – Friedrich Weber (1781–1823)
 F.Wettst. – Fritz von Wettstein (1895–1945)
 F.White – Frank White (1927–1994)
 F.Wilson – Francis Robert Muter Wilson (1832–1903)
 F.Wirtg. – Ferdinand Paul Wirtgen (1848–1924)
 F.W.L.Suckow – Friedrich Wilhelm Ludwig Suckow (1770–1838)
 F.W.Schmidt – Franz Wilibald Schmidt (1764–1796)
 F.W.Schultz – Friedrich Wilhelm Schultz (1804–1876)
 F.W.Wakef. – F.W. Wakefield (fl. 1922)
 F.W.Went – Frits Warmolt Went (1903–1990)
 F.W.Xing – Fu Wu Xing (born 1956)
 F.Y.Liu – Fang Yuan Liu (fl. 1988)
 Fyson – Philip Furley Fyson (1877–1948)
 F.Zenker – Friedrich Albert von Zenker (1825–1898)

G–Z 

To find entries for G–Z, use the table of contents above.

 
1